Chief Philip Morin 232 is an Indian reserve of the Peter Ballantyne Cree Nation in Saskatchewan. It is located inside the city of Prince Albert, making it an urban reserve.

References

Urban Indian reserves in Canada
Indian reserves in Saskatchewan
Division No. 15, Saskatchewan
Peter Ballantyne Cree Nation